Prior to the amendment of Tamil Nadu Entertainments Tax Act 1939 on 4 October 2004, Gross was 125 per cent of Nett for all films. Post-amendment, Gross fell to 115 per cent of Nett. Commercial Taxes Department disclosed 59.09 crore in entertainment tax revenue for the year.

A list of films released in the Tamil film industry in India in 2004:

List of Tamil films

January—March

April—June

July—September

October—December

Other releases
The following films also released in 2004, though the release date remains unknown.

Awards

References

2004
2004 in Indian cinema
Lists of 2004 films by country or language
2000s Tamil-language films